Butyronitrile or butanenitrile or propyl cyanide, is a nitrile with the formula C3H7CN. This colorless liquid is miscible with most polar organic solvents.

Uses
Butyronitrile is mainly used as a precursor to the poultry drug amprolium.

It also has recognized use in the synthesis  of Etifelmine.

Synthesis
Butyronitrile is prepared industrially by the ammoxidation of n-butanol:
C3H7CH2OH  +  NH3  +  O2   →   C3H7CN  +  3 H2O

Occurrence in space 
Butyronitrile has been detected in the Large Molecule Heimat.

References

External links
 NIST Chemistry WebBook page for C4H7N
 CDC - NIOSH Pocket Guide to Chemical Hazards

4